Xuefeng may refer to:

Xuefeng Mountains, a mountain range in western Hunan, China

Township-level divisions in China 
 Xuefeng, a subdistrict of Dongkou County in Hunan.
 Xuefeng Town, a town of Hongjiang City in Hunan.

Chinese names 
 Xue Feng